"Mind Eraser, No Chaser" is the second single released by rock supergroup Them Crooked Vultures. "Mind Eraser, No Chaser" was released on November 3, 2009 as the second single from the band's self-titled debut album (2009). It was released as iTunes's Single Of The Week as part of promotion for their debut album.  The song features vocals from both guitarist Josh Homme and drummer Dave Grohl.

On April 20, 2010, Them Crooked Vultures released a picture disc featuring the songs "Mind Eraser, No Chaser" and a live version of the song "HWY 1" recorded in Sydney, plus an interview on the B-side. The release was in aid of Record Store Day. The single was also released on iTunes.

Charts

References

2009 singles
Them Crooked Vultures songs
Songs written by John Paul Jones (musician)
Songs written by Dave Grohl
2009 songs
Interscope Records singles
Columbia Records singles